WKS Grunwald Poznań is a men's handball club based in Poznań in western Poland, founded in 1961. A one time Polish Champion and three–time Polish Cup winner in the 70s; the club currently plays in the 1st Polish Handball League.

Honours

Domestic
 Polish Superliga
Winners (1): 1970–71
Runners-up (2) - 1971-72, 1990-91

 Polish Cup
Winners (3): 1971–72, 1978–79, 1979–80

References

Bibliography
 
 
 

Polish handball clubs
Sport in Poznań
Handball clubs established in 1961
1961 establishments in Poland